Front-Loading may refer to:
 United_States_presidential_primary#Front-loading, a trend of moving primaries earlier in the calendar
 Washing machine#Front-loading, front loading type of washing machine
 Revolver#Front-loading_cylinder, a type of revolver
 Hole_carding#Front-loading, a strategy to observe a hidden card in a card game